Wesley Augustus Williams (August 26, 1897 – July 3, 1984) was the third African-American to join the New York Fire Department and the first to be promoted to an officer. He was one of the founders of the Vulcan Society in 1940.

Biography
He was born on August 26, 1897, to James Henry Williams (1879–1948) and Lucy Metrash (1881–1932) in Manhattan, New York City. His father was chief of the Red Caps at Grand Central Station in Manhattan. He married Margaret Russell Ford on November 6, 1915 in Westchester County.

He was inspired to join the New York City Fire Department when he read about Samuel Jesse Battle joining the New York City police department. The first African-American to join the New York City Fire Department was William H. Nicholson, who joined in 1918. Williams joined on January 10, 1919, and he was assigned to Engine Company 55 in Manhattan, New York City. He was promoted to lieutenant in 1927.

He retired in 1952 with the rank of battalion chief. His lasting legacy, The Vulcan Society of the FDNY honors him as a founder of the fraternal organization; as an officer of the FDNY he declined office with the society. At the African-American day parades thru Harlem he often was the lead Vulcan as the highest ranking black officer. The FDNY bestows for bravery the Chief Wesley Williams medal at medal day ceremonies.

He died on July 3, 1984 at the Physicians Hospital in Jackson Heights, New York City, he was 86 years old.

Legacy
His papers are archived at the New York Public Library at the Schomburg Center for Research in Black Culture.

References

1897 births
1984 deaths
New York City firefighters
20th-century American firefighters
20th-century African-American people